Wrightia dubia is a species of shrub-plant in the family Apocynaceae.  Its distribution includes: Indo-China and peninsular Malaysia (Kedah, Penang, Pahan); no subspecies are listed in the Catalogue of Life.  In Viet Nam, it may be called lòng mức ngờ.

References

External links 

dubia
Flora of Indo-China
Flora of Vietnam